SMUC Marseille  is a team handball club from Marseille, France. Currently, SMUC Marseille competes in the French First League of Handball.

Between 1989 and 1996 the team was called OM Vitrolles

Accomplishments
EHF Cup Winner's Cup:
 Winner (1): 1993 (as OMV)
 Runners-up (1): 1994 (as OMV)
French league:
 Winner (7): 1965, 1967, 1969, 1975, 1984 (as SMUC) ; 1994, 1996 (as OMV)
 Runners-up (3): 1983 (as SMUC) ; 1993, 1995 (as OMV)
Coupe de France:
 Winner (3): 1976 (as SMUC) ; 1993, 1995 (as OMV)
 Runners-up (2): 1992, 1996 (as OMV)

French handball clubs
Sport in Marseille